Alberto Marcos Carrillo Armenta (born 1954, Guadalajara, Jalisco) is a Mexican politician, Member of Parliament 1991-1994.

Carrillo Armenta studied Communication Sciences at ITESO, and worked as a teacher at the institution in the 1970s. He was a member of the Socialist Workers Party (PST). Between 1980 and 1982 he was the chairman of the Jalisco State Executive Committee of the party. He was also a member of the national leadership of the party. He was elected to the federal parliament in 1991, as a Party of the Cardenist Front of National Reconstruction (PCFRN) candidate. In parliament he led the PFCRN faction. He was also the director of the party organ Insurgencia Cardenista.

References

1954 births
Living people
Members of the Chamber of Deputies (Mexico)
Party of the Cardenist Front of National Reconstruction politicians
Politicians from Guadalajara, Jalisco
Mexican socialists